|}

The Dahlia Stakes is a Group 2 flat horse race in Great Britain open to fillies and mares aged four years or older. It is run over a distance of 1 mile and 1 furlong (1,811 metres) on the Rowley Mile at Newmarket in late April or early May.

History
The event is named after Dahlia, a successful filly in the 1970s. It was established in 1997, and initially held Listed status. It was promoted to Group 3 level in 2004 and upgraded to Group 2 level in 2015.

The Dahlia Stakes is currently staged on the second day of the two-day Guineas Festival meeting. It is run on the same day as the 1000 Guineas.

Records

Most successful horse (2 wins):
 Heaven Sent – 2008, 2009

Leading jockey (6 wins):
 Ryan Moore – Heaven Sent (2008, 2009), Strawberrydaiquiri (2010), Dank (2013), Bragging (2015), Somehow (2017)

Leading trainer (6 wins):
 Sir Michael Stoute – Echelon (2007), Heaven Sent (2008, 2009), Strawberrydaiquiri (2010), Dank (2013), Bragging (2015)

Leading owner (3 wins):
 Cheveley Park Stud - Echelon (2007), Heaven Sent (2008, 2009)
 Godolphin - Usherette (2016), Wuheida (2018), Terebellum (2020)Winners

See also
 Horse racing in Great Britain
 List of British flat horse races

References

 Racing Post:

 galopp-sieger.de – Dahlia Stakes. ifhaonline.org – International Federation of Horseracing Authorities – Dahlia Stakes (2019). pedigreequery.com – Dahlia Stakes – Newmarket.''

Mile category horse races for fillies and mares
Newmarket Racecourse
Flat races in Great Britain
1997 establishments in England
Recurring sporting events established in 1997